Live from the Henry Fonda Theater was a live concert of the band Dredg, released on DVD as a promotional tool for their third album, Catch Without Arms. The DVD was recorded live on June 24, 2005 at the Henry Fonda Theater in Los Angeles, California. It consists of the band playing several songs from the album, mixed with parts of an interview with the band and promos for the album.

Track listing
Intro/Ode to the Sun
Interview
Catch Without Arms
Interview
Advertisement for New Album Catch Without Arms
Interview Introduction to Sang Real
Sang Real
Interview
The Tanbark Is Hot Lava
Interview
Advertisement for New Album Catch Without Arms
Interview Introduction to Bug Eyes
Bug Eyes
Interview
Bug Eyes Video
Interview

References

Dredg albums